Alessandro Miressi (born 2 October 1998) is an Italian swimmer. He is a world record holder in the short course 4×100 metre freestyle relay and an Italian record holder in the long course and short course 100 metre freestyle. In the long course 100 metre freestyle, he was 2018 European champion, 2020 European Championships silver medalist, and 2022 European Championships bronze medalist. In the short course 100 metre freestyle, he was 2021 World champion, 2019 and 2021 European Championships silver medalist, and 2022 World Championships bronze medalist.

Career 
In 2018, Miressi competed in the men's 4 × 100 metre freestyle relay event at the European Championships, winning the silver medal. He then won a gold in the 100 metre freestyle, followed by a bronze in the mixed 4 × 100 metre medley relay. He is the holder of the Italian record in the 100 m freestyle, with 47.45 (2021). He competed at the 2020 Summer Olympics, in Men's 4 × 100 metre freestyle relay, winning a silver medal, the Men's 4 × 100 metre medley relay, winning a bronze medal, and the 100 metre freestyle, where he place sixth.

2021 World Short Course Championships
Day one of the 2021 World Short Course Championships, contested in December in Abu Dhabi, United Arab Emirates, Miressi led-off the 4×100 metre freestyle relay with a 46.12 in the final, contributing to a new Italian record time of 3:03.61 and a silver medal-win. The second day, he helped achieve a fifth-place finish in the 4×50 metre mixed freestyle relay, splitting a 21.18 for the second leg of the relay to contribute to the final time of 1:30.02. Anchoring the 4×50 metre freestyle relay in the final to a finish in 1:23.61 with a split time of 20.61, he helped finish 0.14 seconds ahead of the second-fastest relay team and win the gold medal in the event on day four. On the sixth and final evening, he won his first gold medal of the session in the 100 metre freestyle, winning the event with an Italian record time of 45.57, which broke the Italian record of 45.58 seconds he set in the semifinals of the event the day before. He won his second and final gold medal of the session in the 4×100 metre medley relay, anchoring the finals relay to a Championships record and Italian record time of 3:19.76 in 45.05 seconds.

2022 World Championships
At the 2022 World Aquatics Championships, with swimming competition held in June at Danube Arena in Budapest, Hungary, Miressi won a bronze medal as part of the 4×100 metre freestyle relay in a time of 3:10.95. Swimming a time of 47.48 seconds for the freestyle leg of the 4×100 metre medley relay in the final, he helped tie the European record and set a new Italian record with a finals relay time of 3:27.51 to win the gold medal.

2022 European Championships
On the second day of the 2022 European Aquatics Championships, held in Rome in August, Miressi ranked second in the preliminaries of the 100 metre freestyle, advancing to the semifinals with a time of 47.60 seconds. For the semifinals, he swam a 47.96 and qualified for the final ranking third behind David Popovici of Romania and Kristóf Milák of Hungary. Finishing third in the final behind the same duo as in the semifinals, Miressi won the bronze medal with a time of 47.63 seconds. The following day, day four, he led-off the 4×100 metre freestyle relay in the final with a 47.76, contributing to a gold medal-winning time of 3:10.50. Day five, he split a 47.38 for the second leg of the 4×100 metre mixed freestyle relay in the final to help place fourth with a time of 3:23.62, which was 0.22 seconds behind the bronze medal-winning team from Sweden.

In the preliminaries of the 50 metre freestyle on day six, Miressi was the third-fastest Italian with a time of 22.26 seconds, ranked eighteenth, and did not advance to the semifinals. The following day, he swam the 100 metre freestyle portion of the 4×100 metre medley relay in 47.17 seconds in the final, helping win the gold medal with a new Championships record time of 3:28.46.

2022 Swimming World Cup
At the stop of the 2022 FINA Swimming World Cup circuit held in Berlin, Germany, Miressi competed in the 50 metre freestyle, placing twenty-fourth with a time of 21.94 seconds, and the 100 metre freestyle, where he placed fifth in the final with a time of 47.00 seconds, which was 1.12 seconds slower than gold medalist Kyle Chalmers of Australia.

2022 World Short Course Championships
Day one in Melbourne, Australia for the 2022 World Short Course Championships in December, Miressi led-off the 4×100 metre freestyle relay in the preliminaries with a time of 46.08 seconds to contribute to a first-ranked time of 3:04.46 heading into the final. Later in the day, he helped set a new word record in the event with a 3:02.75 to win the gold medal, contributing a lead-off time of 46.15 seconds to the final mark. In the morning of day three, he swam the first 50 metre portion of the 4×50 metre freestyle relay in 21.26 seconds, helping achieve a third-rank time of 1:24.13 and qualify for the final. For the final of the 100 metre freestyle in the evening session, he won the bronze medal with a personal best time of 45.57 seconds that tied his Italian record in the event. Later in the session, he swam the lead-off leg of the 4×50 metre freestyle relay in 21.22 to contribute to the silver medal-winning time of 1:23.48.

For the preliminaries of the 50 metre freestyle on the fourth morning, Miressi achieved a personal best time of 21.17 seconds, qualifying for the semifinals tied in rank for twelfth overall. In the evening semifinals, he lowered his personal best time to a 21.13, ranked thirteenth, and did not qualify for the final. The following day, in the morning preliminaries, he contributed 20.84 seconds to the time of 1:32.31 for the 4×50 metre medley relay on the freestyle leg of the relay, helping advance the relay to the final ranked first. In the evening, he was substituted out and Leonardo Deplano substituted in on the finals relay, and when the finals relay placed first in a time of 1:29.72 he and the other prelims and finals relay members won the gold medal for their efforts. On the final day, he anchored the 4×100 metre medley relay in the final with a time of 45.56 seconds to help set a new European record with a time of 3:19.06.

International championships (50 m)

International championships (25 m)

 Miressi swam only in the preliminaries.

Personal best times

Long course metres (50 m pool)

Short course metres (25 m pool)

World records

Short course metres (25 m pool)

References

External links
 

1998 births
Living people
Sportspeople from Turin
Italian male swimmers
Italian male freestyle swimmers
Swimmers at the 2015 European Games
European Games medalists in swimming
European Games silver medalists for Italy
European Aquatics Championships medalists in swimming
European Championships (multi-sport event) gold medalists
European Championships (multi-sport event) silver medalists
Medalists at the 2017 Summer Universiade
Mediterranean Games silver medalists for Italy
Mediterranean Games medalists in swimming
Swimmers at the 2018 Mediterranean Games
Universiade silver medalists for Italy
Universiade medalists in swimming
Swimmers of Fiamme Oro
Swimmers at the 2020 Summer Olympics
Medalists at the 2020 Summer Olympics
Olympic silver medalists for Italy
Olympic bronze medalists for Italy
Olympic silver medalists in swimming
Olympic bronze medalists in swimming
Olympic swimmers of Italy
Medalists at the FINA World Swimming Championships (25 m)
World Aquatics Championships medalists in swimming
21st-century Italian people